Cebollatí is a village in the Rocha Department of eastern Uruguay. It is the northernmost settlement of the department.

Geography
A secondary street of  joins it via a small cable ferry with General Enrique Martínez of Treinta y Tres Department.

History
On 28 October 1919, it was declared a "Pueblo" (village) by decree Ley Nº 7.019.

Population
In 2011 Cebollatí had a population of 1,609.
 
Source: Instituto Nacional de Estadística de Uruguay

References

External links
INE map of Cebollatí

Populated places in the Rocha Department